The Grotta del Pisco is a cave on the southwestern side of the island of Capri, Italy. Impasto ware fragments found at the Anacapri site are from the Copper Age. Gaudo culture artifacts were identified here and at the Grotta delle Felci.

References

Caves of Campania
Capri, Campania
Chalcolithic sites of Europe
Archaeological sites in Italy